Sold - For a Spaceship is a novel by Philip E. High published in 1973.

Plot summary
Sold - For a Spaceship is a novel in which the despairing remnants of humanity swiftly improve until mankind has mastery of the universe.

Reception
Dave Langford reviewed Sold - For a Spaceship for White Dwarf #72, and stated that "High has qualities of excitement and compassion which make his work stand out in this series (if nowhere else)."

Reviews
Review by Chris Morgan (1985) in Fantasy Review, November 1985

References

1973 British novels
1973 science fiction novels
British science fiction novels
Robert Hale books